Branson Kayne Perry (born February 24, 1981; disappeared April 11, 2001) was an American missing person who vanished under mysterious circumstances from his residence at 304 West Oak Street in Skidmore, Missouri. His disappearance received national media coverage and was profiled extensively by journalist and crime writer Diane Fanning in a book concerning Perry's relative, Bobbie Jo Stinnett, who was murdered and had her unborn child stolen in 2004.

Timeline 
Perry disappeared on the afternoon of April 11, 2001, after walking out of his house, having told a visiting friend that he was returning a pair of jumper cables to an exterior shed. This was the last time he was seen. After several years of investigation, police arrested Jack Wayne Rogers of Fulton, Missouri, on various charges unrelated to Perry's disappearance. In their investigation, they recovered message board posts made from Rogers's home computer that described a first-hand account of Perry's rape and murder. Rogers denied any involvement, and was sentenced to thirty years in prison on the unrelated charges in 2004.

Background 

Branson Kayne Perry was born February 24, 1981, and raised in Skidmore, Missouri. He graduated from Nodaway-Holt High School in 1999. After graduating, he worked odd jobs, including work as a roofer and helping maintain a traveling petting zoo in the area. Perry resided with his father, Bob Perry, at 304 West Oak Street in Skidmore; his parents were recently divorced. Perry suffered from tachycardia, a condition that made his heart race excessively. He was a black belt in hapkido.

Disappearance 

On a Wednesday afternoon of April 11, 2001, Perry invited his friend, Jena, over to his house to help clean the residence as his father, Bob Perry, who had recently been hospitalized, was due to return home. At this same time, two other unnamed men were outside the residence working on Bob's car, which needed a new alternator. At approximately 3:00 p.m., Perry told Jena he was going to take a pair of jumper cables outside to a shed adjacent to the house. This was the last time he was seen.

Investigation 

On April 12, Perry's grandmother, Jo Ann, stopped by his home and found the house unlocked and deserted. She found this unusual and called the residence periodically over the next several days, but got no answer. Upon calling Perry's mother, Rebecca Klino, she found she had not spoken to him either. Bob was discharged from the hospital several days later than planned and, after his release, he and Klino filed a missing person report on April 17. Ground search parties were organized by Nodaway County police within a  radius of the Perry residence. Numerous fields, farms, and abandoned buildings were searched, but the efforts proved fruitless. During a search of the property, police were unable to locate the jumper cables Perry had purportedly left to return in the shed; two weeks later, however, they were found just inside the door.

Over the following month and a half, over one hundred people were interviewed in Perry's disappearance. Jena, who had been at Perry's home the day of the disappearance, admitted to law enforcement that he had recently been experimenting with marijuana and amphetamines. A family member also informed police that Perry had a bottle of Valium in his possession the day he disappeared. Law enforcement questioned drug acquaintances of Perry's in St. Joseph, but all stated they had not seen him and each passed polygraph examinations. Further investigation into the local drug trade was undertaken, but no discernable leads were uncovered despite rumors that Perry owed drug dealers money. Bob initially suspected that his son had left to stay with friends in Kansas City. Because Perry did not have a working car at the time, Bob presumed he may have hitchhiked.

Jack Wayne Rogers 

On April 10, 2003, law enforcement arrested Jack Wayne Rogers, a 59-year-old Presbyterian minister and Boy Scout leader. Rogers was arrested on charges of first-degree assault and practicing medicine without a license after removing a trans woman's genitals in a makeshift gender reassignment surgery at a hotel in Columbia.

While investigating Rogers's personal belongings, detectives discovered child pornography on his computer, as well as evidence of various posts made on message boards under the usernames "BuggerButt," "ohailsatan," and "extremebodymods," describing the graphic torture and assault of multiple men. In the posts, Rogers also discussed cannibalizing the genitals of men he had castrated. Among these posts was a firsthand account of Rogers' picking up a blond male hitchhiker, then raping, torturing, mutilating, and murdering him. In the online post, it was claimed that the man's body was buried in a remote area of the Ozarks. Despite this, Rogers denied ever seeing Perry or knowing him, and asserted that the post made was fabricated and purely fantasy; law enforcement, however, suspected the man in question was Perry. While performing a subsequent search of Rogers' property, a turtle claw necklace resembling one owned by Perry was discovered in one of his vehicles.

In April 2004, Rogers was convicted and sentenced to seventeen years in prison for assault and seven years for performing illegal surgery, as well as thirty years for child pornography charges, which would run concurrent with the former two charges. At his sentencing, Perry's mother begged for Rogers to reveal his whereabouts, but Rogers denied being involved in the disappearance. His earliest release date is October 30, 2028, when he will be 83 years old.  After attending the sentencing, Perry's mother stated she no longer felt Rogers was responsible for her son's disappearance:

Subsequent developments 

Perry's father died in 2004. In June 2009, law enforcement revealed they were completing an excavation of a site in Quitman, Missouri, after receiving a "credible tip" that Perry's remains may have been located there. In 2010, Klino offered a $20,000 reward for information leading to her son's whereabouts.

In February 2011, Klino died after a years-long battle with melanoma. Jo Ann Stinnett, Perry's grandmother, said at the time of Klino's death: "Around town, we searched every oil well, every outside toilet. We searched everywhere that was possible for us to think that something could be there." Monica Caison, the founder of the CUE Center for Missing Persons and a friend of Klino, stated that she and other close friends has "promised her they would continue to look for her son." In her obituary, it was noted that Klino was "preceded in death" by Perry, and she was buried beside an empty plot for Perry that lists his date of death as April 11, 2001, the same day he disappeared.

On August 14, 2022, the current Nodaway County Sheriff, Randy Strong announced a suspect had been identified, but more evidence was needed before an arrest could be made.

Publicity 

Perry's disappearance was profiled extensively in a chapter of Diane Fanning's 2006 book Baby Be Mine, which focused on the murder of his cousin, Bobbie Jo Stinnett, in 2004. The case also received coverage in a July 17, 2010, episode of the Fox television program America's Most Wanted and in the Sundance Channel series No One Saw a Thing in 2019.

See also 

 List of people who disappeared
 Murder of Bobbie Jo Stinnett, Perry's cousin, in 2004

References

Sources

External links 

 BringBransonHome.WordPress.com
 Family photo archive of Branson Perry
 Branson Kayne Perry at The Charley Project
 Branson Kayne Perry at NamUs

2000s missing person cases
2001 in Missouri
April 2001 events in the United States
Missing person cases in Missouri
Nodaway County, Missouri